The temple of Durga is located near Krushnaprasad village in an area called Nua Satanga and Motia in Cuttack district, Odisha, India. The temple is dedicated to Mahishamardini and Chamunda.

The central icon which is worshipped is a four-handed goddess slaying Mahishasura. In her upper two hands she holds Shankha and Chakra, while the lower hands have a trident and a hand on the buffalo-headed demon. Several sculptures were discovered by the Archaeological Survey of India here which demonstrated that the shrine belongs to the era of Somavamsi rule during the 10th century. An image of Surya is worshipped here.

Location
It can be approached from Phulnakhara square near Niali  in Cuttack district.

References

External links
reports
sculptures in around

Hindu temples in Cuttack
Durga temples